Monde Sakhile Hadebe (born ) is a former South African rugby union player, whose regular position is hooker. He retired from rugby in 2016 when he was given a four-year ban following a positive drugs test.

Playing career

Youth

Hadebe attended Westville Boys' High School and was selected to represent his local provincial union, KwaZulu-Natal at several youth tournaments. He represented them at Under-16 level at the Grant Khomo Week in 2006 and at the Under-18 Craven Week – the premier high school rugby union competition in South Africa – in both 2007 and 2008. In 2008, he was also included in a South African Under-18 southern elite squad after the tournament.

After finishing school, Hadebe joined the  Academy and he made six appearances for the  side during the 2009 Under-19 Provincial Championship.

Hadebe was included in the South African Under-20 squad that played at the 2010 IRB Junior World Championship held in Argentina. He started in all three of their matches in Pool C of the competition; a 40–14 victory over Tonga in the opening match was followed by a 73–0 victory over Scotland, before South Africa suffered their first ever pool stage defeat in the history of the competition, losing 35–42 to Australia. Although finishing in second position in the pool, they still qualified for the semi-finals by virtue of having the best record of the second-placed teams across the three pools. Hadebe started their semi-final match as they were eliminated 7–36 by New Zealand, and also in the third-place play-off, as South Africa beat England 27–22 to secure third position in the competition. Upon the team's return to South Africa, Hadebe made four appearances for the  side during the 2010 Under-21 Provincial Championship.

Sharks

Hadebe was included for the  squad that took part in the 2011 Vodacom Cup competition. He couldn't prevent the Sharks XV from losing the match 26–41 to be eliminated from the competition by the eventual champions.

In the second half of the year, Hadebe played for and captained the  side during the 2012 Under-21 Provincial Championship. He scored tries in their matches against the s and the s as his side won nine out of their twelve matches during the regular season, finishing in second position on the log. During the Under-21 Provincial Championship, he was also called up into the senior team that played in the 2011 Currie Cup Premier Division.

He appeared in all seven of their matches during the regular season – four starts and three appearances from the bench – as the Sharks XV finished in second position in the Southern Section of the competition. The Sharks finished top of the log, but Hadebe missed out on the play-off rounds, as a 20–3 victory over the  secured them a place in the final, only to lose at the final hurdle to Western Province, going down 18–25 in Durban.

Hadebe was the first choice hooker for the Sharks XV during the 2013 Vodacom Cup, starting all eight of their matches. They finished top of the Southern Section log, but crashed out as the quarter final stage as they lost to the Golden Lions. As soon as the tournament finished, Hadebe joined the  Super Rugby squad for the 2013 Super Rugby season, linking up with the team during their tour of Australia. He was also restricted to just four appearances – all of those as a replacement – for the Sharks during the 2013 Currie Cup Premier Division. It was a successful season for the team, however, as they won their seventh Currie Cup competition, beating Western Province 33–19 in the final.

Hadebe again appeared in all of the Sharks XV's matches in the Vodacom Cup competition in 2014. Their Round Four match against the  saw Hadebe score the first senior try of his career in a 27–10 victory, and the Sharks XV again finished top of the Southern Section log. For the second season in a row they lost in the quarter finals, with the Golden Lions eliminating them at this stage for the second season in a row. Hadebe didn't feature for the Super Rugby side at all, but made four appearances in the 2014 Currie Cup Premier Division. He was an unused replacement in three matches, but came on against the Golden Lions in their penultimate match in the regular season and starting their final match against Western Province as the Sharks qualified for the semi-finals after finishing in third position. Hadebe came on as a replacement in their semi-final against the Golden Lions, but could not prevent the side from Johannesburg easily winning the match 50–20.

In addition, he also made four starts for the Sharks XV in the 2015 Vodacom Cup. He was the most-used hooker for the  during the 2015 Currie Cup Premier Division, starting six of their ten matches, and coming on as a replacement in a further two matches.

In November 2015, Hadebe was named in the Sharks training squad for the 2016 Super Rugby season, but then joined the Port Elizabeth-based  outfit for a trial period as they prepared for the Super Rugby season. However, he picked up an injury during training and returned to the Durban-based side.

Drugs ban

In July 2016, it was revealed that Hadebe received a four-year ban from the sport after failing a drugs test, banning him from playing rugby at any level until May 2020. He tested positively for two forbidden forms of steroids.

The  released a statement following Hadebe's suspension, announcing that the player retired from professional rugby.

Career statistics

References

1990 births
Living people
Doping cases in rugby union
Griquas (rugby union) players
Rugby union hookers
Rugby union players from Durban
Sharks (Currie Cup) players
Sharks (rugby union) players
South Africa Under-20 international rugby union players
South African rugby union players